Project ARMS, simply known in Japan as ARMS, is a Japanese manga series written by Kyoichi Nanatsuki and illustrated by Ryoji Minagawa. It was serialized in Shogakukan's Weekly Shōnen Sunday from April 1997 to May 2002, with its chapters collected in 22 tankōbon volumes. The story follows Ryo Takatsuki, who gets involved in an accident when in kindergarten, horribly damaging his arm, but the doctors somehow manage to save it. Several years later, his arm turns out to be more than a normal arm.

It was adapted into a 52-episode anime television series produced by TMS Entertainment and broadcast on TV Tokyo from April 2001 to March 2002. In North America, both the manga and the anime series were licensed by Viz Media. The anime was re-licensed by Discotek Media in 2017.

By October 2012, the manga had over 15 million copies in circulation. In 1999, Project ARMS received the 44th Shogakukan Manga Award for the shōnen category.

Plot
The story follows a young man named Ryo Takatsuki, who at the beginning of the series believes that he was in an accident causing his right arm to be severed from his body. However, as the story progresses, it is revealed that he was actually a test subject for experiments involving genetics and an "ARMS" nanomachine implant, along with three other youths: Hayato Shingu, Takeshi Tomoe and Kei Kuruma. They all meet under strange circumstances and after many battles they set off on a journey to rescue Ryo's girlfriend Katsumi Akagi, who is kidnapped by the Egrigori, an immense organization founded by Keith White and Doctor Samuel Tillinghast, that operates in the shadows and has bases, research facilities, and agents all over the world, and are the creators of the ARMS technology.

Characters

Main characters

He seems a polite and friendly teenager, but he has extraordinary hidden abilities. Ryo's parents, Iwao and Misa Takatsuki, are former mercenaries who knew he would have to combat Egrigori. They quietly trained him in survival techniques, martial arts, and strategy. Ryo always calmly analyzes any new situation and figures out the best solution. Ryo also has a high regard for human life and free will, and always fights for these with everything he has. Cool-headed most of the time, Ryo is an excellent leader, strategist, and overall combatant, Ryo nonetheless dislikes killing, but will do so if necessary. Ryo cares a great deal about his childhood friend, Katsumi. As of the epilogue, they are married and have a child who is strongly implied to be the reincarnation of the redeemed Black Alice.

He is a passionate person who constantly lives in the moment, and can switch from rage to shock to grief all in an instant. Hayato has a powerful sense of justice, and will instantly leap in to protect the helpless or punish evildoers. When Hayato was seven he saw Egrigori slaughter everyone in his home village and burn it to the ground. Keith Black, one of Keith White clones (collectively known as "The Keiths", who could survive an ARMS implantation), killed Hayato's parents before his eyes and cut off his left arm, which was later replaced by his ARMS, the White Knight. Hayato then went to live with his grandfather Juzo and learned his Shingu style of martial arts. Haunted by his parents' deaths Hayato only lived for revenge, and he hunted down and destroyed Egrigori agents wherever he found them. After Hayato meets Ryo and his fellow ARMS, he gains more self-control, self-awareness, and compassion, which allows him to unlock the 'Heart of Water' technique; a skill that allows him to read his opponents - shortly after, he used it to defeat the superhumanly strong mutant martial artist, Kou Karunagi. Eventually Hayato gives up his revenge and becomes a protector rather than a destroyer, allowing him to access the Knight's ultimate form. Hayato and Kei grow closer over the course of the series, and as of the epilogue, have apparently been in a relationship for some time.

He is the most unlikely hero of all the ARMS subjects. Takeshi is smart, skinny, sensitive, solitary, and timid, the classic target for high school bullies. Takeshi was constantly tormented at school, which caused his ARMS to first activate. Takeshi then became even more isolated, genuinely loathing his own body and his cowardice. After Takeshi meets Ryo and his fellow ARMS, he finally realizes that he is not alone. He also realizes his family and friends are what he really cares about, and that he must fight to protect them. Takeshi then becomes a brave, loyal, and powerful member of the team. In addition to his ARMS, Takeshi's reflexes are incredibly fast. Since sustaining crippling injuries at the hands of Kou Karunagi, Takeshi and the White Rabbit was in a dormant, cocoon-like state and was communicating with Alice while the rest of the team was fighting in Carillon Tower. However, when Ryo and the Jabberwock merged with Black Alice, White Alice offered Takeshi his choice of one of many weapons, all of which would give him more power than any earthly weapon. Takeshi declined the power, however, and instead took White Alice with him out of her isolation in Carillon Tower, and using their combined power they were able to attack and merge with the Jabberwock which allows White Alice to directly confront her evil half.

The only girl of the team. Unlike the others, Kei has known about her ARMS her entire life. She was raised by the Bluemen, the organization that combats Egrigori and originally implanted ARMS in the four teens. Kei was raised and trained as an elite soldier. But because many of the Bluemen saw her as a weapon and not a person, Kei grew up extremely lonely, bitter, and even a little vicious. This all changes when Kei meets Ryo and the other ARMS subjects, the only people who truly understand Kei. With them she finally learns true friendship and teamwork. Kei and Hayato grow closer over the course of the series, and as of the epilogue, they have apparently been in a relationship for some time.

 Ryo's neighbor and classmate. A kind and compassionate person, she is also extremely strong willed and has no problems telling people when they are being idiots. Katsumi has been Ryo's closest friend since early childhood, and secretly loves him. Unknown to Katsumi herself, she is also an Egrigori experiment with a vital part to play in Egrigori's master plan. Katsumi was, in fact, one of the original ARMS-compatible embryos, which is why she and Kei bear such a close resemblance to one another. However, she was not given an ARMS implant for unknown reasons. After Ryo's ARMS activates, Katsumi is always beside Ryo trying to keep him calm and sane. Katsumi is taken prisoner by Egrigori, but despite her long imprisonment she is always certain that Ryo would come for her. Later in the story, she has seemingly been killed by the actions of Keith White and Ryo. White used Keith Green's time-space jump to pull her into the path of one of Ryo's attacks. However, she is resurrected in the aftermath of Alice's death. In the epilogue, she and Ryo are married and have a child who appears to be the reincarnation of the redeemed Black Alice.

ARMS

The greatest power in the Egrigori, progenitor of the ARMS and the unseen director of all the events surrounding the ARMS teens. Born when both Keith White and Samuel Tillinghast were in their mid-thirties, she was a child prodigy, a true genius with phenomenal knowledge. She was the first to understand and then communicate with the lifeform Azazel, and she also cared deeply for the many children that Egrigori used as guinea pigs. Creator of a unique breed of blue roses, named "Blue Wish", while a prodigy, she was nonetheless a mere nine-year-old girl, and thus began cracking under the constant pressure of her role as a precious specimen and the monstrous treatments administered to the test subjects by her "fathers". What triggered her anger came after her tenth birthday, when with Azazel's aid she tried to escape with the children, at least to let them see what the outside world was like. This attempt failed, and she witnessed the slaughter of all the children by order of Keith White: it was during this massacre that she was mortally wounded and her full rage and hatred awakened, prompting Azazel to absorb and merge with her, thus creating the core of what would become the supercomputer Alice, Egrigori's most powerful entity, and the four original ARMS cores, each one of them being a piece of her thoughts and emotions. What was not known until much later was that, when she merged with Azazel, Alice's mind split in two personas: "White Alice", that showed her positive feelings, and "Black Alice", a psychotic being driven by despair and pure hatred. While White Alice destroys herself to bring down her destructive alter-ego, Black Alice is unintentionally saved when, crumbling to death, she is briefly touched by Katsumi. Fueled by her hatred for mankind, but also by a much more simple need of love, Black Alice possesses Katsumi and attempts to exterminate humanity in the form of the Bandersnatch, but is defeated by Ryo and his Jabberwock. In the end she regains her sanity, having been shown human warmth for the first time in her life, and is reborn as a fully human girl, the daughter of Ryo and Katsumi.

The Jabberwock is the most powerful of the four original ARMS, due to its ability to evolve extremely quickly in response to any threat. Its AI is extremely violent and unstable; the Jabberwock is the embodiment of Black Alice's hatred - for most of the series its transformed state is simply an engine of destruction, though it eventually submits to Ryo's will. It can feed off Ryo's anger and vice versa, allowing them to synchronize much more easily than Hayato, Takeshi or Kei. Initially it was a powerful hand to hand weapon that could elongate, transform into a shield, and exhibited a limited ability to move on its own to protect Ryo, focused in his right arm. The Jabberwock's nanomachines also give Ryo an innate ability to heal much faster than a normal human even in his untransformed state. The Jabberwock's ultimate form is a hulking red demonic humanoid containing nothing but pure rage and destructive force and is triggered by its host's hatred and anger.

Also simply called Knight, is Hayato's ARMS and is concentrated in his left arm. The Knight seems to be the manifestation of White Alice's will to protect. Hayato's arm transforms into multiple fighting blades and a projectile launcher for close combat. The blades produced by the Knight are supposedly the hardest substance that an ARMS can produce, however, this seems to be influenced to some degree by the emotional state and skill level of Hayato. The Knight's nano-machines allow Hayato to heal injuries much faster than a normal human even in his untransformed state. White Knight's ultimate form is a powerful armored knight whose lance, the "Lance of Mistilteinn", can destroy other ARMS with an Anti-ARMS Nano-Virus, and as such, it negates the regenerative property of ARMS. The Knight's ultimate form is triggered by its host's desire to protect. During his final fight against Kou Karunagi, the knight develops the ability to allow Hayato to enter into a half-transformed state where the ARMS nano-machines spread throughout his entire body and dramatically increase all of his physical attributes (similar to the half-transformation shown by Ryo Takatsuki). In his fight against Keith Violet the Knight's Lance of Mistilteinn evolved into a vastly more powerful form. It is now a double pointed energy lance that is able to destroy ARMS nano-machines by projecting an intense energy field with every swing and was able to instantly disable Violet's Evil Eye of Balor. White Knight's secret mission is to destroy Jabberwock if it gets completely out of control, and Hayato does not want to be his best friend's executioner.

Takeshi's ARMS, concentrated in Takeshi's legs. It appears to be the manifestation of White Alice's innocence. Takeshi can run and jump incredibly fast, perform seemingly impossible mid-air maneuvers, impressive feats of reflex & body coordination and fly up to several hundred feet. Takeshi is also capable of performing astoundingly fast kickboxing capable of shattering concrete and high-speed acrobatic manoeuvers. To put it in perspective, he was able to weave in and out of the spinning blades of two helicopters and move and attack so fast that even the Red Caps, using their telepathic abilities to anticipate his moves, could not keep up with him. The White Rabbit's nano-machines allow Takeshi to heal injuries much faster than a normal human. White Rabbit's ultimate form is a winged humanoid that can fly faster than the speed of sound - it is hinted that the White Rabbit's speed is only limited by Takeshi's belief. Though initially exhibiting no obvious weapons, the White Rabbit (and takeshi as well) are well versed in high-speed combat, easily outmatching the most advanced high-speed cyborgs in Egrigoi's arsenal. The speeds that the White Rabbit can reach during a full transformation allow it to put massive amounts of kinetic energy behind any attack it makes, able to reach supersonic speeds almost instantly and offensively utilize the supersonic shockwaves generated to severely damage or destroy opponents. Even the Jabberwock, during an out-of-control transformation caused by Black Alice, was crippled by a direct impact at full speed. In addition to the raw speed accessible to the White Rabbit, after being initially reawakened from his coma The White Rabbit could access near superluminal flight speeds. Appearing as a continuous ray of light while in motion carrying enough mass to blast through Space-Time rips created by Keith White. Again after Awakening from dormancy by a reborn White Alice to fight the Modulated ARMS Troopers, the White Rabbit showed that its already impressive existing abilities were enhanced and it gained the ability to emit a massive pulse of energy that caused those affected by it to completely disintegrate. The White Rabbit's ultimate form is triggered by its host's selflessness. Like the Knight, White Rabbit is also ready to destroy Jabberwock if he gets completely out of control.

Kei's ARMS, concentrated in her eyes. Unlike the other three original ARMS, the Queen of Hearts does not appear to be affiliated with either White or Black Alice; she is possibly a manifestation of Alice's objectivity (as a scientist), which fits her role as a 'judge' (in her own words, the Queen was born "to be a judge of Alice herself.. to judge... ARMS or mankind"). Kei's ARMS is an array of powerful sensors, including magnification and infrared. Kei can figure out a punch before it is thrown, or a bullet's course before it leaves the barrel, and avoid them. Kei can also activate, enhance, and deactivate the ARMS of her teammates. The Queen of Hearts' nano-machines allow Kei to heal from injuries much faster than a normal human even when not transformed. Kei has nicknamed her nano-machines her "nano-babies". The Queen Of Hearts' final form is a magnificent woman made of light. Similar to the White Rabbit, the Queen's ultimate form is unlocked by a wish; however, unlike the other original ARMS, where the host is asked "Do you want Power?", the Queen asks "Do you want Light?". The Queen of Hearts' powers are the least defined of all ARMS, but she has accomplished the following feats: shutting down the out of control Jabberwock, Rabbit and Knight; a powerful shield called the 'Mirror of Aegis' which can block and reverse any attack (even the giant Jabberwock); and the ability to destroy all the ARMS, including Alice herself, though this will also kill the hosts (It is unknown whether Kei has the mental strength to actually use this ability). In the final battle against the Bandersnatch, the Queen's faceplate is lifted and her identity is revealed as White Alice, though it is likely that this is a result of the events following the activation of Jabberwock.

As Black Alice dies, Katsumi reaches out to her and for a moment, comes into contact. This brief contact leads to the implant of an ARMS core inside Katsumi's body: signs of its growing power are shown on many occasions, in the form of grisly nightmares and increasingly unstable behaviour, culminating in the massacre of a group of thugs, and is subsequently possessed by a resurrected Black Alice. The Bandersnatch's ultimate form is a white version of the Jabberwock: its power is exceptional, as opposed to the Jabberwock's ultimate ability of anti-matter production and flame manipulation, the Bandersnatch's ultimate power is Nitrogen Manipulation; able to freeze a town-sized area to absolute zero and create whiteouts with a mere thought. A more proactive usage of her phenomenal power would be the ability to control and guide the absolute cold, emitting and taking it with her wherever she goes as though the ice and freeze were somehow alive and connected to her. Wherever she goes the icing effect will follow, being at its strongest with her at its epicenter.

Media

Manga
Project ARMS, written by Kyoichi Nanatsuki and illustrated by Ryōji Minagawa, was serialized in Shogakukan's shōnen manga magazine Weekly Shōnen Sunday from April 2, 1997, to May 1, 2002. Shogakukan collected its chapters into twenty-two tankōbon volumes, published between October 18, 1997, and June 18, 2002.

In North America, Viz Media licensed the manga in 2002, and published its individual volumes from May 1, 2003 to May 12, 2009.

Volume list

Anime
A 52-episode anime television series adaptation produced by TMS Entertainment was broadcast on TV Tokyo. The first season from April 7 to September 29, 2001, and a second season from October 6, 2001 to March 30, 2002. The first two opening themes are "FreeBird" and "Breath on Me" performed by New Cinema Tokage and the two ending themes "Just Wanna Be" by Wag and "Call my Name" by Garnet Crow. The second season opening 

In North American Viz Media licensed the series in 2002, but it has since gone out of print. Discotek Media announced during their Otakon 2017 panel that they have acquired the series.

List of episodes

Season 1

Season 2

Reception
By October 2012, the manga had over 15 million copies in circulation. Project ARMS won the 44th Shogakukan Manga Award for the shōnen category in 1999.

See also
Area D, another manga series written by Nanatsuki
Tantei Xeno to Nanatsu no Satsujin Misshitsu, another manga series written by Nanatsuki
 Sunday vs Magazine: Shūketsu! Chōjō Daikessen, a video game including characters from this series

References

External links
 Project ARMS official anime website at TMS Entertainment
 
 

2001 anime television series debuts
Action anime and manga
Comics based on Alice in Wonderland
Cyberpunk anime and manga
Discotek Media
Fictional cyborgs
Ryōji Minagawa
Shogakukan manga
Shōnen manga
TMS Entertainment
TV Tokyo original programming
Viz Media anime
Viz Media manga
Winners of the Shogakukan Manga Award for shōnen manga